Hannes Van der Bruggen (born 1 April 1993) is a Belgian professional footballer who plays for Cercle Brugge in the Belgian Pro League.

Club career

Gent
Van der Bruggen began his professional footballing career at Gent in 2010, after spending six years in the club's academy. In November 2011, he scored his first goal for the club in a 2–0 victory over Genk. During the second qualifying round of the 2012–13 UEFA Europa League season, he made his European debut against Differdange 03 in Luxembourg. At the age of 19, Van der Bruggen was named as Gent's new captain in 2013. On 21 May 2015, he made history with Gent, as he helped lead them to their first league title in their 115 year history.

Kortrijk
In January 2017, Van der Bruggen signed a four and a half year contract with KV Kortrijk.

Cercle Brugge 
On 19 January 2021, Van Der Bruggen signed with Belgian Pro League club, Cercle Brugge. He made his debut for the club on 20 January 2021 against Royal Antwerp as his club lost 1–0.

International career
Van Der Bruggen has represented the Belgian national youth teams up to the Belgium U21.

Career statistics

Honours
Gent
Belgian First Division (1): 2014–15
Belgian Super Cup: 2015

References

External links
 
 

1993 births
Living people
Belgian footballers
Belgium youth international footballers
Belgium under-21 international footballers
Belgian Pro League players
K.A.A. Gent players
K.V. Kortrijk players
Cercle Brugge K.S.V. players
Sportspeople from Aalst, Belgium
Footballers from East Flanders
Association football midfielders